Malicheh (also Romanized as Mālīcheh; also known as Mālīcheh Sāmen) is a village in Haram Rud-e Sofla Rural District, Samen District, Malayer County, Hamadan Province, Iran. At the 2006 census, its population was 98, in 29 families.

References 

Populated places in Malayer County